The 1890 Pennsylvania gubernatorial election occurred on November 4, 1890. Democratic candidate and former Governor Robert E. Pattison defeated Republican candidate George W. Delamater to become Governor of Pennsylvania. As of the  2022 midterm elections, this is the last presidential, gubernatorial, or senatorial election in Pennsylvania where the Democratic candidate won the state without carrying Allegheny County. William A. Wallace and Chauncey Forward Black unsuccessfully sought the Democratic nomination.

Results

References

1890
Pennsylvania
Gubernatorial
November 1890 events